Stebnik may refer to:

Stebník,  village in Slovakia
Stebnyk, city in Lviv Oblast, Ukraine